Soul My Way is the seventh album by Jerry Lee Lewis released on the Smash label in 1967.

Background
Jerry Lee Lewis signed with Smash in 1963 and, after four years, Mercury executives did not seem to know what do with him. Although he remained very popular in Europe, and a riveting live performer, he enjoyed little chart success. Mercury had tried an album of Sun Records remakes (Golden Hits of Jerry Lee Lewis in 1964) and a country-themed album (Country Songs for City Folks in 1965) but they did not come close to recapturing the triumphs Lewis had enjoyed with Sam Phillips. Rock and pop music had also changed enormously by 1967, making it more difficult for Mercury to figure out how to market Lewis. As Colin Escott notes in the sleeve to the 1995 Mercury compilation Killer Country, by the late '60s "Jerry's idea of rock music was almost ten years out of date. In private conversation, he would offer the opinion that the Beatles should go back across the Atlantic at a slow walk, but no amount of posturing could turn back the clock."

Recording
By 1967, producer Shelby Singleton left Mercury to form his own label and Jerry Kennedy would take complete charge of Lewis's recordings. Kennedy eventually produced Jerry Lee's comeback single "Another Place, Another Time" the following year, which ushered in a string of country hits for Lewis well into the next decade but, as biographer Joe Bonomo writes in Jerry Lee Lewis: Lost and Found, by 1967 Kennedy was "scratching his head over what the heck to do. Jerry Lee's lone album in 1967, the curious (and among Killer fans somewhat infamous) Soul My Way, was a hodgepodge of old tracks and new that Kennedy attempted to unify with variety show pizzazz." The album is noteworthy for its cover of Bobby "Blue" Bland's "Turn On Your Love Light" and its take on Texas songwriter Mickey Newbury's psychedelic "Just Dropped In (To See What Condition My Condition Was In)", which features Lewis playing harpsichord. Three tracks, "Wedding Bells", the Lewis original "He Took It Like a Man", and "Betcha Gonna Like It" had been recorded during sessions dating back to 1963 and 1964.

Reception
Soul My Way was released November 1, 1967 to commercial and public indifference, failing to crack the Billboard chart.

Track listing

References

1967 albums
Jerry Lee Lewis albums
Albums produced by Jerry Kennedy
Smash Records albums